Élodie Rogge-Dietrich (born 3 September 1983) is a retired New Caledonian-French tennis player.

On 27 December 2010, she reached her career-high singles ranking of world No. 498. On 26 July 2010, she set her best doubles ranking of world No. 618. Rogge-Dietrich won one singles title on the ITF Circuit. In November 2010, she defeated American player Yasmin Schnack in Manila, Philippines, in straight sets 6–4, 6–0.

She also won the women's singles gold medal at the South Pacific Games in 2003, and 2007, and at the 2011 Pacific Games.

In 2009, Rogge-Dietrich won the gold medal at the 2009 Pacific Mini Games in mixed doubles, partnering Nickolas N’Godrela. She was also part of the New Caledonian Tennis Team which won gold at the 2015 Pacific Games in Women's Team Event.

Rogge-Dietrich retired from professional tennis 2011.

Other finals

Singles

Doubles

Mixed doubles

References

External links
 
 

1983 births
Living people
People from Nouméa
French female tennis players
New Caledonian female tennis players